Should've Known Better or Should Have Known Better may refer to:

 "Should Have Known Better", a Ministry song from the 1983 album With Sympathy
 "Should've Known Better" (Richard Marx song), 1987
 "Should've Known Better" (Soluna Samay song), 2012
 "Should Have Known Better", 2015 song by Sufjan Stevens
 "Should've Known Better", 2018 song by Clean Bandit from What Is Love?

See also 
 I Should Have Known Better (disambiguation)
 Shoulda Known Better (disambiguation)